Zero copula is a linguistic phenomenon whereby the subject is joined to the predicate without overt marking of this relationship (like the copula "to be" in English). One can distinguish languages that simply do not have a copula and languages that have a copula that is optional in some contexts.

Many languages exhibit this in some contexts, including Assamese, Bengali, Kannada, Malay/Indonesian, Turkish, Tamil, Telugu, Malayalam, Hindi, Guarani, Kazakh, Turkmen, Japanese, Ukrainian, Russian, Belarusian, Tatar, Azerbaijani, Swahili, Hungarian, Hebrew, Arabic, Berber, Ganda, Hawaiian, Sinhala, Irish, Welsh, Nahuatl, Maori, Mongolian, Greenlandic, Lithuanian, Latvian, Polish, Slovakian, Quechua and American Sign Language.

Dropping the copula is also found, to a lesser extent, in English and many other languages, used most frequently in rhetoric, casual speech, non-standard varieties, and headlinese, the writing style used in newspaper headlines. Sometimes, these omissions cause unintended syntactic ambiguity.

In English

Standard English exhibits a few limited forms of the zero copula. One is found in comparative correlatives like "the higher, the better" and "the more the merrier". However, no known natural language lacks this structure, and it is not clear how a comparative is joined with its correlate in this kind of copula. Zero copula also appears in casual questions and statements like "you from out of town?" and "enough already!" where the verb (and more) may be omitted due to syncope. It can also be found, in a slightly different and more regular form, in the headlines of English newspapers, where short words and articles are generally omitted to conserve space. For example, a headline would more likely say "Parliament at a standstill" than "Parliament is at a standstill". Because headlines are generally simple, in "A is B" statements, an explicit copula is rarely necessary.

Zero copulae are very common in sports announcing: "Johnson already with two hits today." "Unitas with a lot of time."

The zero copula is far more common in some varieties of Caribbean creoles and African American Vernacular English, where phrases like "where you at?", and "who she?" can occur. As in Russian and Arabic, the copula can only be omitted in the present tense; the copula can only be omitted in African American Vernacular English where it can be contracted in Standard American English.

In other languages
Omission frequently depends on the tense and use of the copula.

Assamese
In Assamese zero copula is usually used in the present tense with a prepositional phrase or the adverb 'here' or 'there'. For example, in the sentence,  ("We are here"), the copula  is omitted.

Russian
In Russian the copula  is normally omitted in the present tense, but not in the past and "future tenses":

Present (omitted):
 ("She at home"), literally "She is now at home, in the house"
Past (used):
 ("She was at home")

The third person plural  ("are") is still used in some standard phrases, but since it is a homonym of the noun "essence", most native speakers do not notice it to be a verb:
 ("they are one and the same").

The verb  is the infinitive of "to be". The third person singular,  means "is" (and it is a homophone of the infinitive "to eat"). As a copula, it can be inflected into the past, "future", and conditional forms. A present tense exists; however, it is almost never used as a copula, but rather omitted altogether or replaced by the verb  ("to be in essence"). Thus one can say:
 ("she was a beautiful woman")—predicate noun in instrumental case.
 ("she is a beautiful woman")—predicate noun in the nominative case.
 ("she is a beautiful woman")—predicate noun also in instrumental.

But not usually:
 ("she is a beautiful woman"), which would be very formal and would suggest something more than a copula, something more existential than the normal English use of "is". As a result, this construction is quite rare.

But in some cases the verb  in the present tense (form ) is employed:  (Be who you are).

The present tense of the copula in Russian was in common use well into the 19th century (as attested in the works of Fyodor Dostoyevsky) but is now used only for archaic effect (analogous to "thou art" in English).

Turkic languages

There is a contrast between the regular verb "to be" and the copulative/auxiliary verb "to be" in Turkish.

The auxiliary verb  shows its existence only through suffixes to predicates that can be nouns, adjectives or arguably conjugated verb stems, arguably being the only irregular verb in Turkish. In the third person, zero copula is the rule, as in Hungarian or Russian. For example:

{| border="0" cellspacing="2" cellpadding="1"
| align=left | || align=right | || align=left |
|-
| 
| "[The] sea [is] blue." || (the auxiliary verb  is implied only);
|-
| 
|}

The essential copula is possible in the third person singular:

{| border="0" cellspacing="2" cellpadding="1"
| align=left | || align=right | || align=left |
|-
| 
| "[The] sea is (always, characteristically) blue."
|}

In Tatar,  expresses doubt rather than a characteristic.

In the modern Tatar language copula is a disappearing grammatical phenomenon and is only rarely used with the first and second person (while the third person copula has fallen completely out of use). In the past there was a full paradigm for all persons:

{| border="0" cellspacing="5" cellpadding="1"
| align=left | || align=right | || align=left |
|-
| 
| Singular || Plural
|-
| I person
| -мын/-мен || -быз/-без
|-
| II person
| -сың/-сең || -сыз/-сез
|-
| III person
| -дыр/-дер (-тыр/тер) || -дыр/-дер (-тыр/тер)
|}

For example:  ("I'm a teacher"),  ("You're a teacher"),  ("He/She's a teacher"). While the copulas for the first and second person are historically derived from personal pronouns, the third person copula comes from the verb  ("stand, live, exist"). For negation the copula affix is attached to the negative particle :  ("I'm not a writer"). The copula is only used with nouns. Sometimes the noun can be in the locative case:  ("You are at home").

Japanese

Māori

Arabic
In Arabic, a Semitic language, the use of the zero copula again depends on the context. In the present tense affirmative, when the subject is definite and the predicate is indefinite, the subject is simply juxtaposed with its predicate. When both the subject and the predicate are definite, a pronoun (agreeing with the subject) may be inserted between the two. For example:
, "Muhammad is an engineer" (lit. "Muhammad an-engineer")
, "Muhammad is the engineer' (lit. "Muhammad he the-engineer")

The extra pronoun is highly recommended in order for one not to confuse the predicate for a qualifying adjective:
, "Muhammad the engineer'
(This is just a noun phrase with no copula. See al- for more on the use of definite and indefinite nouns in Arabic and how it affects the copula.)

, "Muhammad was an engineer' ( = "(he) was") (literally "be it Muhammad an-engineer")
, "Muhammad is not an engineer' (lit. "Muhammad is not an-engineer")

When the copula is expressed with a verb, no pronoun need be inserted, regardless of the definiteness of the predicate:
, "Muhammad is not the engineer' (lit. "Muhammad is not of the-engineer")

Hebrew, another Semitic language, uses zero copula in a very similar way.

Ganda
The Ganda verb "to be", is used in only two cases: when the predicate is a prepositional phrase and when the subject is a pronoun and the predicate is an adjective:
, "She is beautiful' ("(he/she) is")
, "Kintu is in the car" (literally "Kintu he-is in-car")

Otherwise, the zero copula is used:
, "The girl is beautiful" (literally "the-girl beautiful")
Here the word , "beautiful" is missing its initial vowel pre-prefix . If included, it would make the adjective qualify the noun  attributively:
, "The beautiful girl' or "a beautiful girl".

American Sign Language
American Sign Language does not have a copula. For example, "my hair is wet" is signed my hair wet, and "my name is Pete" may be signed [MY NAME]topic P-E-T-E.

Irish
The copula  is used in Irish but may be omitted in the present tense. For example,  ("He is a big man") can be expressed as simply . The common phrase  (meaning "anyhow", lit. "Whatever story it [is]") also omits the copula.

Welsh

The fact that Welsh often requires the use of a predicative particle to denote non-definite predicates means that the copula can be omitted in certain phrases. For example, the phrase  ("Since he is/was/etc. a short man...") literally translates as "And he [particle] a short man...". The zero copula is especially common in Welsh poetry of the  style.

Amerindian languages
Nahuatl, as well as some other Amerindian languages, has no copula. Instead of using a copula, it is possible to conjugate nouns or adjectives like verbs.

Grammarians and other comparative linguists, however, do not consider this to constitute a zero copula but rather an affixal copula. Affixal copulae are not unique to Amerindian languages but can be found, for instance, in Korean and in the Eskimo languages.

Many indigenous languages of South America do, however, have true zero copulae in which no overt free or bound morpheme is present when one noun is equated with another. In fact, zero-copula is likely to occur in third-person contexts in Southern Quechua (notice wasiqa hatunmi 'the house is big' vs. wasiqa hatunmi kan 'the house is big', where kan, the Quechua copula, is not really needed, as suggested by the first sentence).

Yaghan, from Tierra del Fuego, used, in its heyday back in the mid-19th century, zero copula as one option, when introducing new participants in discourse, but had a slew of posture-based copular verbs for all other contexts. So I could say, kvnji-u:a Jon (lit. 'this man IS John'(zero copula). kvnji 'this', u:a 'man' (v here is schwa, and colon marks tenseness of the vowel preceding it), but once John has been introduced I might say, Jon lvpatvx-wvshta:gu:a mu:ta 'John is a woodworker', lvpatvx 'wood' (x voiceless velar fricative), wvshta:gu: 'work' u:a 'man', mu:ta irregular present tense form of mu:tu: 'to be (sitting) (or occupied doing)'

Chinese 
Modern Standard Chinese, as well as many other Chinese dialects, uses a copula, such as the Mandarin word shì (是), before nouns in predications, like in Wŏ shì Zhōngguó rén (我是中国人 / I am Chinese), but not usually before verbs or adjectives. For example, saying Wǒ shì kāixīn (我是开心 / I am happy) is a grammatically incorrect sentence, but saying Wǒ kāixīn (我开心 / I happy), is correct. Adverbs can be added to the adjective, like in Wǒ hĕn kāixīn (我很开心 / I very happy). A copula may be used for adjectives, however, if the particle de (的) is added after the adjective, like in Wǒ shì kāixīn de (我是开心的).

Vietnamese
Somewhat similar to Chinese, the Vietnamese language requires the copula  before nouns in predications but does not use a copula before verbs or adjectives, thus  (I am a student) but  (I [am] smart). The topic marker  may appear before an adjective to emphasize the subject, for example  (As for me, I am smart). Many prepositions in Vietnamese originated as verbs and continue to function as verbs in sentences that would use a copula in English.

See also
Turkish copula
Zero copula in Hungarian
Double copula or copula duplication; used in some styles of English
Pro-drop languages, in which a subject pronoun is commonly omitted or implied

References

Literature
Wolfram, Walter (1969) A Sociolinguistic Description of Detroit Negro Speech. Washington, DC: Center for Applied Linguistics p. 165-179

Nonstandard English grammar
Verb types
Zero (linguistics)

br:Verb-stagañ mann
he:אוגד#העדר אוגד